Naqsh-e Rajab is an archaeological site just west of Istakhr and about 5 km north of Persepolis in Fars Province, Iran.

Together with Naqsh-e Rustam, which lies 2.5 km away, the site is part of the Marvdasht cultural complex. Together, the two sites are a tentative candidate for UNESCO World Heritage status.

Naqsh-e Rajab is the site of four limestone rockface inscriptions and rock-cut bas-reliefs that date to the early Sassanid era. One of the carvings is the investiture inscription of Ardeshir I (ruled in 226-241 CE), the founder of the dynasty. The second investiture inscription is Ardeshir's successor, Shapur I (241-272 CE). A third bas-relief, known as 'Shapur's Parade' celebrates the king's military victory in 244 over the Roman emperor Philip the Arab. A fourth bas-relief and inscription is attributed to Kartir, high priest under Shapur I and his sons Hormizd I (272-273 CE) and Bahram I (273–276 CE).

See also
 List of colossal sculpture in situ
 Naqsh-e Rustam
 Taq-e Bostan, another site of Sassanid-era rock reliefs.

References

External links

Marvdasht complex
Sasanian architecture
Sculpture of the Ancient Near East
Buildings and structures in Fars Province
Tourist attractions in Fars Province
Outdoor sculptures in Iran
Rock reliefs in Iran
Ardashir I
Shapur I
Archaeological sites in Iran